The David Grisman Quintet is a self-styled alternative bluegrass/acoustic jazz band founded by David Grisman in 1975 in San Francisco, California, US. The quintet draws from genres including Bill Monroe's bluegrass legacy and Django Reinhard's 1930s swing. Since its formation, the Quintet's members have included guitarist Tony Rice and multiinstrumentalists Mark O'Connor, Mike Marshall, Darol Anger and Jon Sholle. The Quintet has performed and recorded with guests such as violinist Stephane Grapelli, and remains active. The National Public Radio program Car Talk uses the band's instrumental "Dawggy Mountain Breakdown" as its theme music.

Discography
The following albums have been released by the David Grisman Quintet:

The David Grisman Quintet - 1977
Hot Dawg - 1978
Quintet '80 - 1980
Mondo Mando - 1981
Dawg '90 - 1990
Dawgwood - 1993
Dawganova - 1995
DGQ-20 - 1996
Dawgnation - 2002
Dawg's Groove - 2006

David Grisman Quintet timeline

Timeline

Notes

External links
www.dawgnet.com, official website of David Grisman

American folk musical groups
American bluegrass music groups
Articles which contain graphical timelines